Blossoms in Isolation is a compilation of cover versions and reworkings of their own songs by English indie pop band Blossoms. It was recorded 'in isolation' during the lockdown imposed by the UK government in response to the COVID-19 pandemic in the United Kingdom.

Track listing

Charts

See also
List of 2020 albums

References

2020 albums
Blossoms (band) albums